The government of Tennessee is organized under the provisions of the 1870 Constitution of Tennessee, first adopted in 1796. As set forth by the state constitution, Tennessee's government is divided into three branches: executive, judicial, and legislative branches. 

The seat of the government in Tennessee is in its capital city of Nashville.

Executive branch

Governor 

As set by the Constitution, Tennessee's governor is the Supreme Executive Power. The governor (currently Governor Bill Lee) is responsible for enforcing state laws and the state constitution and is also known as the keeper of the Great Seal of the State of Tennessee.

Lieutenant Governor 
The Lieutenant Governor's main role is legislative, The lieutenant governor is a state senator elected by the entire Senate to be Speaker of the Senate. If the Governor is incapacitated or dies in office, then the Lieutenant Governor becomes the Governor.

Cabinet Members 
The Tennessee Governor's Cabinet an advisory body which oversees the executive branch of the Tennessee state government. Members, titled "commissioners," are appointed by the governor--not subject to the approval of the General Assembly--and oversee the various government departments and agencies. Additionally, several members of the Governor's staff serve on the Cabinet. Governors-elect can, and often do, rearrange the departments, and thus the number of commissioners.

Under incumbent Governor Bill Lee, there are 29 members of the Cabinet: 22 commissioners, 1 director, and 6 members of the Governor's staff.

Legislative Branch

Tennessee General Assembly 

The state legislature is known as the Tennessee General Assembly. It consists of the 33-member Senate and the 99-member House of Representatives. Senators serve four-year terms, and House members serve two-year terms. Each chamber elects its own speaker from among its members. The General Assembly is a part-time legislature, typically meeting from January through April or May each year.

The current Lieutenant Governor and Speaker of the Senate is Randy McNally (R-Oak Ridge). He was elected on January 10, 2017 and is the second, consecutive Republican to hold the office.

The current Speaker of the House is Cameron Sexton (R-Crossville)

Constitutional Officers 
Tennessee's three constitutional officers are elected by a joint session of the legislature. The Comptroller of the Treasury and State Treasurer are elected for two-year terms, and the Secretary of State is elected for a four-year term.

Judicial Branch

Supreme Court
The Supreme Court of Tennessee is the state's Court of Last Resort. It is composed of a chief justice, currently Jeffrey S. Bivins, and four associate justices, currently Holly Kirby, Cornelia Clark, Sharon Lee, and Roger Page. No more than two justices can be from the same Grand Division. 

In a unique method known as the Tennessee Plan, Supreme Court justices, like all other appellate court judges, the Governor fills any vacancies that occur, with the advice and consent of the Tennessee General Assembly, from a list of three judges compiled by a commission. At the next election in which a Governor is elected, voters are asked whether they want to retain or remove the newly-confirmed justice. Retention votes are held every eight years after. If voters decide to remove a justice, the process begins again. 

As required by the Tennessee Constitution, the Supreme Court regularly meets in Jackson, Knoxville, and Nashville. In addition to the regular meetings of the Supreme Court, the Court takes their oral arguments on the road as part of the SCALES program (Supreme Court Advancing Legal Education for Students) a few times each year.

Attorney General 
The Tennessee Attorney General and Reporter is the state's chief legal officer and works to represent all of state government. The Attorney General employs around 340 people across five offices around the state. 

The Tennessee Supreme Court appoints the Attorney General, a method not found in any of the other 49 states. The incumbent Attorney General is Herbert Slatery III.

Intermediate Appellate Courts 
The intermediate appellate courts of Tennessee include the court of appeals and the court of criminal appeals. The court of appeals hears cases appealed from probate, chancery, and circuit courts, whereas the court of criminal appeals hears cases appealed from circuit and criminal courts.

Both the Court of Appeals and the Court of Criminal Appeals have 12 judges.

Trial Courts 
Trial courts in the state of Tennessee include probate courts, chancery courts, circuit courts, and criminal courts. The circuit courts, chancery and probate courts, and criminal courts each have 31 judicial districts.

Courts of Limited Jurisdiction 
The courts of limited jurisdiction include juvenile courts, general sessions courts, and municipal courts.

See also
 Tennessee State Capitol in Nashville

External links
 TN.gov

References 

 
Tennessee